The Gazda Helicospeeder was an American-built single-seat single-rotor helicopter of the 1940s.

Development
The Helicospeeder was designed by Antoine Gazda of Wakefield, Rhode Island in 1946.  It was specified to carry one person and publicity releases claimed an ultimate goal of a  maximum airspeed. One example of the initial version was completed.

The Model 100 Helicospeeder was developed in 1947, again with a single seat.  It was of all-aluminium construction and was powered by a Continental A-75 engine.  One example was completed.

Operational history
Production examples were expected to sell for 5000 US Dollars, but no firm sales were made.

Variants

Antoine Gazda planned to build the Model 101, which was intended to accommodate two persons, but no record of its completion has been found.

Aircraft on display
The Model 100 Helicospeeder is preserved at the Owls Head Transportation Museum, adjacent to the Knox County Regional Airport, two miles south of Rockland, Maine.

Specifications (Model 100)

See also

Notes

References

|

External links
Data on Helicospeeder
Photo of Helicospeeder

1940s United States civil utility aircraft
1940s United States helicopters
Aircraft first flown in 1946
Single-engined piston helicopters